McCabe Creek is a stream in Wayne County in the U.S. state of Missouri. It is a tributary to Bear Creek.

Geography 
The stream headwaters are in northern Wayne County south of Missouri Route 34 to the east of Clubb (at ) and the stream flows south and southwest to its confluence with Bear Creek just southwest of the community of Hiram adjacent to Missouri Route C (at ).

Name 
McCabe Creek has the name of a pioneer citizen.

See also
List of rivers of Missouri

References

Rivers of Wayne County, Missouri
Rivers of Missouri